Rostratula is a genus of painted-snipes. It contains two extant species distributed across Africa, Asia and Australia.

Species

Extant Species

Fossils
†Rostratula minator is an extinct species, described from Pliocene deposits in South Africa.

References
 Lane, B.A.; & Rogers, D.I. (2000). The Australian Painted Snipe, Rostratula (benghalensis) australis: an Endangered species?. Stilt 36: 26-34

 
Taxa named by Louis Jean Pierre Vieillot